Néstor Vicente Vidrio Serrano (born 22 March 1989), also known as Woody, is a Mexican professional footballer who plays as a centre-back for Liga MX club Mazatlán. He is an Olympic gold medalist.

Club career

Atlas
Vidrio came up in the Atlas youth systems and had a chance to debut for the first squad during the 2008 InterLiga tournament, thanks to then-coach Miguel Ángel Brindisi. Néstor later won Rookie of the Season for the Clausura 2008. Vidrio has earned himself a starting position as a defender for Atlas.

Pachuca
On 7 December 2011 Vidrio was transferred to C.F. Pachuca.

Guadalajara
On 1 July 2013 Vidrio signed with C.D. Guadalajara. He scored his first league goal in a match against Leones Negros on 7 September 2014.

International career
Vidrio was capped by the under-20 team during the 2009 CONCACAF U-20 Championship. He played in all 3 games of the group stage.

Vidrio won the Olympic gold medal at the 2012 London Olympics with the under-23 side.

U-23 International appearances

''As of 11 August

Honours
Mexico U23
Toulon Tournament: 2012
Olympic Gold Medal: 2012

Notes

References

External links 
 
 
 futbol.univision.com
 Néstor Vidrio at ESPN Deportes 
 
 
 
 

Living people
Mexican footballers
Footballers from Guadalajara, Jalisco
Atlas F.C. footballers
Association football midfielders
1989 births
Olympic footballers of Mexico
Footballers at the 2012 Summer Olympics
Olympic gold medalists for Mexico
Olympic medalists in football
C.F. Pachuca players
C.D. Guadalajara footballers
Liga MX players
Mexico youth international footballers
Medalists at the 2012 Summer Olympics